A murder mystery is a work of crime fiction.

Murder mystery may also refer to:

Murder Mystery (band), an American rock band
Murder Mystery (film), a 2019 American comedy mystery film
"Murder Mystery" (Schitt's Creek), a television episode
"Murder Mystery", a song by Edan from Beauty and the Beat, 2005
"The Murder Mystery", a song by the Velvet Underground from The Velvet Underground, 1969

See also
Murder mystery game, a party game
Mystery dinner, a type of dinner theater
Murder, Mystery and My Family, a 2018–2021 British television series